Floyd-Jones is a surname. Notable people with the name include:

 David R. Floyd-Jones (1813–1871), American lawyer and politician
 DeLancey Floyd-Jones (1826–1902), American brevet brigadier general in the U.S. Civil War
 Edward Floyd-Jones (1823–1901), American politician
 Elbert Floyd-Jones (1817–1901), American politician
 Henry Floyd-Jones (1792–1862), American politician, father of DeLancey Floyd-Jones and uncle of David Floyd-Jones

See also
 Floyd (surname)
 Jones (surname)

Compound surnames